Julia Butschkow (born 21 December 1978) Danish writer, playwright and poet, educated at Forfatterskolen 2001. She has written the play Sidespor, performed in Malmö and Copenhagen.

Bibliography 
 Aber dabei, Samleren, 2013 (Novel)
 Der er ingen bjerge i Danmark, Samleren, 2011 (Short stories)
 Apropos Opa, Samleren, 2009 (Novel)
 Lunatia, Samleren, 2004 (Novel)
 Så simpelt, Samleren, 1999 (Short stories)
 Lykkekomplex, Facet, 1997 (Poems)

Prizes and recognition 
 Statens Kunstfonds three-year grant 2005
 Honour grant Rosinante og Co 2007

References

External links 
 Authors homepage
 Rosinate & Co
 Danish Literary Magazine

Danish women poets
Living people
1978 births
20th-century Danish poets
20th-century Danish women writers